Jack Little (born John Leonard; May 30, 1899 – April 9, 1956), (Another source gives his birth date as May 28, 1902.) sometimes credited Little Jack Little, was a British-born American composer, singer, pianist, actor, and songwriter whose songs were featured in several movies. He is not to be confused with the burlesque comedian also known as "Little" Jack Little, who stood 4'5".

Early years
Little was born in the Silvertown section of London, but moved to the United States
when he was 9 years old, growing up in Waterloo, Iowa. He was educated in pre-med classes at the University of Iowa, where he played in and organized the university band.

Career
Early in his career, Little worked at radio stations, including WSAI and WLW, both in Cincinnati, Ohio. He had a 15-minute daily program (originating from WLW) on NBC radio in the early 1930s.

Little toured the country with an orchestra, appearing in hotels, night clubs, and on radio. In one such touring appearance on radio, at WOC in Davenport, Iowa, Little "made a new endurance record for himself ... when he remained on the air three hours and sixteen minutes ... [and] sang fifty-one songs in answer to thousands of requests." He collaborated musically with Tommie Malie, Dick Finch, John Siras, and Joe Young.

In 1928 he joined ASCAP. From 1933 to 1937, he recorded prolifically, starting on Bluebird, Columbia, and finally ARC, playing in a light society dance band style. He often worked with musical director Mitchell Ayres. His compositions include "Jealous, I Promise You", "A Shanty in Old Shanty Town" and "You're a Heavenly Thing". Details of his chart success per Joel Whitburn are given below.

Chart successes

Recognition
Little has a star at 6618 Hollywood Boulevard in the Radio section of the Hollywood Walk of Fame. It was dedicated February 8, 1960.

Personal life
He was married to Thea Hellman, who died in 1940; they had two children.

Death
Little died in his sleep on April 9, 1956, at his home in Hollywood, Florida after suffering from hepatitis for some time.

References

External links

Little Jack Little on YouTube
 Jack Little recordings at the Discography of American Historical Recordings.

1899 births
1956 deaths
1956 suicides
People from Silvertown
American male composers
Songwriters from Iowa
British emigrants to the United States
Writers from Waterloo, Iowa
Suicides in Florida
University of Iowa alumni
20th-century American singers
20th-century American composers
20th-century American male singers
American male songwriters
Radio personalities from Iowa